Chelodynerus is a monotypic genus of potter wasps which is found on Maui in Hawaii.

References

Potter wasps